Quercus crispifolia is a species of oak tree. It is native to southern Mexico, Guatemala, and El Salvador. It is placed in section Lobatae.

Range and habitat
Quercus crispifolia is native to Guerrero, Oaxaca, and Chiapas states of southern Mexico, where it lives in the Sierra Madre del Sur and Chiapas Highlands, and in the Sierra Madre de Chiapas of Chiapas, Guatemala, and El Salvador. It has an estimated area of occupancy (AOO) of 104 km2.

Quercus crispifolia is native to low montane rain forests from 900 to 2,700 meters elevation.

Much of the species' montane forest habitat has been replaced with coffee plantations. A population is conserved within El Triunfo Biosphere Reserve.

References

crispifolia
Oaks of Mexico
Flora of the Sierra Madre del Sur
Flora of the Chiapas Highlands
Sierra Madre de Chiapas
Trees of Guatemala
Trees of El Salvador
Plants described in 1924
Taxa named by William Trelease